Benoît Paire and Stanislas Wawrinka were the defending champions, but lost in the first round to top seeds Rohan Bopanna and Aisam-ul-Haq Qureshi.
Johan Brunström and Frederik Nielsen won the title, defeating Marin Draganja and Mate Pavić in the final, 6–2, 4–6, [10–7].

Seeds

Draw

Draw

References
Main draw
Main draw.pdf

Doubles